Takashi Koizumi (小泉堯史 Koizumi Takashi) (born November 6, 1944, in Mito) is a Japanese film director. After graduating from Waseda University, he served as an assistant director for Akira Kurosawa for many years.

Filmography

Awards

Nominations
 AFI Fest 1999:
 Grand Jury Prize for After the Rain
 Award of the Japanese Academy 2001:
 Best Director for After the Rain
 Award of the Japanese Academy 2003:
 Best Director for Letters from the Mountains
 Best Screenplay for Letters from the Mountains

Won
 Venice International Film Festival 1999:
 CinemAwenire Award in Best Film on the Relationship of Man-Nature for After the Rain
 São Paulo International Film Festival 1999:
 Mostra Special Award for After the Rain
 Portland International Film Festival 2001:
 Audience Award for Best First Film: After the Rain
 27th Fajr International Film Festival 2009 (Eastern Vista section):
 Best Screenplay for Best Wishes for Tomorrow

References

External links
 
 JMDb Listing (in Japanese)

Japanese film directors
Living people
1944 births